Revolutionary Left Movement (Movimiento de (la) Izquierda Revolucionaria) may refer to:
Revolutionary Left Movement (Bolivia)
Revolutionary Left Movement (Chile)
Revolutionary Left Movement (Peru)
Revolutionary Left Movement (Venezuela)

Political party disambiguation pages